David Daniel Eggler (April 30, 1849 – April 5, 1902) was a Major League Baseball center fielder. He was born in Brooklyn, New York.

He went on to play for the Philadelphia White Stockings and Athletic of Philadelphia in the NA.

After the formation of the National League, Eggler remained with Philadelphia, then went on to play for the Chicago White Stockings, Buffalo Bisons, and Baltimore Orioles before his career ended.

Dave Eggler now holds an unfortunate record, as his 2,544 at-bats and 2,593 plate appearances are the most by any player with 0 career home runs, statistically making him the game's least prolific home run hitter. However, because his career began before the formation of the modern National League, the record isn't universally recognized as Eggler's. Also, the rarity of the home run during his career means that his inability to hit one was understandable; in 1871 (the first year of his career), his entire league combined to hit 47 home runs - a single-season home run mark that has been equalled or surpassed by 62 different individuals a combined 107 times since then.

He died after being hit by a train in Buffalo, New York.

See also
List of Major League Baseball annual runs scored leaders

External links

1849 births
1902 deaths
19th-century baseball players
Major League Baseball center fielders
Brooklyn Eckfords (NABBP) players
New York Mutuals (NABBP) players
New York Mutuals players
Philadelphia White Stockings players
Philadelphia Athletics (NA) players
Philadelphia Athletics (NL) players
Chicago White Stockings players
Buffalo Bisons (NL) players
Baltimore Orioles (NL) players
Sportspeople from Brooklyn
Baseball players from New York City
Accidental deaths in New York (state)
Railway accident deaths in the United States
Philadelphia Athletic players
Buffalo (minor league baseball) players
Buffalo Bisons (minor league) players